The 1926 Cornell Big Red football team was an American football team that represented Cornell University during the 1926 college football season.  In their seventh season under head coach Gil Dobie, the Big Red compiled a 6–1–1 record and outscored all opponents by a combined total of 191 to 64.

Schedule

References

Cornell
Cornell Big Red football seasons
Cornell Big Red football